Dame Sarah Joanne Storey,  (née Bailey; born 26 October 1977) is a British Paralympic athlete in cycling and swimming, and a multiple gold medalist in the Paralympic Games, and six times British (able-bodied) national track champion (2 × Pursuit, 1 × Points, 3 × Team Pursuit). Her total of 28 Paralympic medals including 17 gold medals makes her the most successful (by gold medals) and most decorated (by total medals) British Paralympian of all time as well as one of the most decorated Paralympic athletes of all time. She has the unique distinction of winning five gold medals in Paralympics before turning 19.

Storey's major achievements include being a 29-time World champion (6 in swimming and 23 in cycling), a 21-time European champion (18 in swimming and 3 in cycling) and holding 75 world records. She is regarded as one of the most experienced campaigners in the history of the Paralympics as she took part at the Paralympics on eight occasions in 1992, 1996, 2000, 2004, 2008, 2012, 2016 and 2020. She is a current para world record holder in women's 3000m individual pursuit and hour record.

On 2 September 2021, she surpassed Mike Kenny's 16 Paralympic gold medal record to become Great Britain's most successful Paralympic athlete of all time after securing her 17th Paralympic gold medal when she won the women’s road race C4-5 event.

Early life
Storey was born Sarah Bailey in Manchester without a functioning left hand after her arm became entangled in the umbilical cord in the womb and the hand did not develop as normal. As a schoolgirl, she was subjected to bullying by her school mates and also faced eating disorder issues at school. She joined her first swimming club at the age of ten and was told by her coach that she had started her training too late to be good at anything.

Swimming at the Paralympic Games
Storey began her Paralympic career as a swimmer, winning two golds, three silvers and a bronze in Barcelona in 1992. She made her maiden appearance at the Paralympics in 1992 at the age of 14. She continued swimming in the next three Paralympic Games before switching to cycling in 2005, reputedly because of a persisting ear infection. It was revealed that she ended up with chronic fatigue syndrome before her 19th birthday.

She retained her Paralympic gold medals in women's 100m backstroke and 200m individual medley events at the 1996 Summer Paralympics. Despite the ear infection triggered by chronic fatigue syndrome, she continued to participate in swimming and claimed four silver medals and a solitary bronze in the next two Paralympic Games in 2000 and 2004 before quitting the sport.

Cycling

At the 2008 Paralympic Games, her fifth, Storey won the individual pursuit – in a time that would have been in the top eight at the Olympic final – and the road

Storey also competes against non-disabled athletes and won the 3 km national track pursuit championship in 2008, eight days after taking the Paralympic title, and successfully defended her title in 2009. In 2014, she added a third national track title with a win in the points race.

Storey qualified to join the England team for the 2010 Commonwealth Games in Delhi, where she was "the first disabled cyclist to compete for England at the Commonwealth Games", against non-disabled cyclists. She was also the second Paralympic athlete overall competing for England at the Games, following archer Danielle Brown earlier in Delhi.

In 2011, Storey competed for one of the three places in the GB squad for the women's team pursuit at the 2012 Olympic Games. Although she was in the winning team for the World Cup event in Cali, Colombia in December 2011, she was informed afterwards that she was being dropped from the team pursuit squad.

London's 2012 Paralympics Games saw Storey win Britain's first gold medal, in the women's individual C5 pursuit. She went on to win three more gold medals, one in the Time Trial C4–5 500m, one in the Individual Road Time Trial C5 and finally one in the Individual Road Race C4–5.

In 2014, Storey and her husband Barney Storey founded the Pearl Izumi Sports Tours International women's amateur cycling team, supporting the charity Boot Out Breast Cancer. The team fielded squads in the 2014 and 2015 British road race seasons.

Storey attempted to break the world hour record at the Lee Valley VeloPark in London on 28 February 2015. She set a distance of 45.502 km, which was 563m short of Leontien Zijlaard-van Moorsel's 2003 overall world record – however Storey's distance did set a new world record in the C5 Paralympic cycling class as well as a new British record.

In the Rio 2016 Paralympics Storey became Britain's most successful female Paralympian when she won the C5 3000m individual pursuit final.

She became the first athlete to win the gold medal for Great Britain at the 2020 Summer Paralympics when she defended her Paralympic title in the women's individual pursuit C5 event. It was also her fifth Paralympic gold medal in track cycling and her tenth Paralympic gold medal in women's cycling. It was also her record 15th gold medal in her Paralympic career. During the qualifying heat event at the 2020 Summer Paralympics, she also incredibly shattered her own world record by four seconds in the individual pursuit C5 category.

Personal life
Storey married tandem pilot and coach Barney Storey in 2007. She gave birth to a daughter on 30 June 2013 and a son on 14 October 2017. She and her husband live in Disley, Cheshire.

In April 2019, Storey was appointed Active Travel Commissioner for the Sheffield City Region.

Honours
Storey was appointed Member of the Order of the British Empire (MBE) in the 1998 New Year Honours "for services to Swimming for People with Disabilities". Following the Beijing Games, she was appointed Officer of the Order of the British Empire (OBE) in the 2009 New Year Honours "for services to Disabled Sport." In 2012, she was awarded an honorary degree by the University of Manchester. Following the 2012 London Games, she was appointed Dame Commander of the Order of the British Empire (DBE) in the 2013 New Year Honours "for services to para-cycling".

Storey was a nominee for the 2008 Laureus World Sportswoman of the Year with a Disability and the 2012 BBC Sports Personality of the Year. She won The Sunday Times Disability Sportswoman of the Year in 2020, her win being officially announced in an online ceremony.

Major results

1992
Paralympic Games
1st  100 m Backstroke
1st  200 m Individual Medley
2nd  400 m Freestyle
2nd  4x100 m Freestyle
2nd  4x100 m Medley
3rd  100 m Freestyle

1994
World Para Swimming Championships
1st  200 m Individual Medley
1st  100 m Breaststroke
2nd  100 m Backstroke
2nd  400 m Freestyle
3rd  4x100 m Medley

1996
Paralympic Games
1st  100 m Breaststroke
1st  100 m Backstroke
1st  200 m Individual Medley
2nd  400 m Freestyle
3rd  100 m Freestyle

1998
World Para Swimming Championships
2nd  100 m Backstroke
2nd  4x100 m Medley
3rd  400 m Freestyle
3rd  200 m Individual Medley
3rd  100 m Breaststroke
3rd  4x100 m Freestyle

2000
Paralympic Games
2nd  100 m Backstroke
2nd  4x100 m Medley

2002
World Para Swimming Championships
1st  100 m Freestyle
1st  400 m Freestyle
1st  200 m Individual Medley
2nd  100 m Backstroke
3rd  50 m Freestyle

2004
Paralympic Games
2nd  100 m Breaststroke
2nd  200 m Individual Medley
3rd  100 m Freestyle

2005
European Para-cycling Championships
1st  Road Race
1st  Individual Pursuit
1st  500m Time Trial
2nd Time Trial
European Open Para-cycling Championships
1st Road Race
1st Individual Pursuit
2nd 500m Time Trial
3rd Time Trial
National Track Championships
7th Individual Pursuit

2006
UCI Track Para-cycling World Championships
1st  Individual Pursuit
3rd 500m Time Trial
National Track Championships
1st  Para-cycling Individual Pursuit
3rd Individual Pursuit
7th 500m Time Trial
UCI Para-cycling Road World Championships
2nd Road Race
2nd Time Trial

2007
UCI Para-cycling Road World Championships
1st  Individual Pursuit
3rd 500m Time Trial
National Road Championships
1st  Para-cycling Road Race
National Track Championships
1st  Para-cycling Individual Pursuit
7th 500m Time Trial
UCI Paralympic World Cup
1st Individual Pursuit
1st 500m Time Trial

2008
Paralympic Games
1st  Time Trial
1st  Individual Pursuit
National Track Championships
1st  Individual Pursuit
UCI Paralympic World Cup
1st Individual Pursuit
3rd 500m Time Trial

2009
UCI Track Para-cycling World Championships
1st  Individual Pursuit
1st  500m Time Trial
UCI Road Para-cycling World Championships
1st  Road Race
1st  Time Trial	
UCI Masters Road Para-cycling World Championships
1st  Time Trial
2nd Road Race
National Track Championships
1st  Individual Pursuit
UCI Paralympic World Cup
1st Individual Pursuit
1st 500m Time Trial

2010
UCI Road Para-cycling World Championships
1st  Road Race
1st  Time Trial
National Track Championships
1st  Team Pursuit
2nd Individual Pursuit
6th Commonwealth Games, Individual Pursuit
1st  Overall 2 Days of Bedford International Stage Race
1st Stages 1 & 2
9th National Road Championships, Road Race

2011
UCI Track Para-cycling World Championships
1st  Individual Pursuit
1st  500m Time Trial
UCI Road Para-cycling World Championships
1st  Road Race
1st  Time Trial
National Track Championships
1st  Team Pursuit
4th Individual Pursuit
1st  Overall 2 Days of Bedford International Stage Race
1st  Mountains classification
1st Stages 1 & 2
UCI Track Cycling World Cup–Manchester
1st Team Pursuit
Sydney Road World Cup
1st Road Race
1st Time Trial
1st Blenheim Palace Time Trial Event
3rd National Road Championships, Time Trial

2012
Paralympic Games
1st  Individual Pursuit
1st  500m Time Trial
1st  Time Trial
1st  Road Race
2012 UCI Track Para-cycling World Championships
1st  Individual Pursuit
1st  Time Trial
2nd Team Sprint
UCI Track Cycling World Cup–Cali
1st Team Pursuit
1st Overall Essex Giro Stage Race
1st Blenheim Palace Time Trial
1st Curlew Cup Road Race
1st Caperwry Road Race
1st Cheshire Classic Road Race
9th Overall Tour du Limousin

2014
2014 UCI Track Para-cycling World Championships
1st  Individual Pursuit
1st  Scratch Race
3rd 500m Time Trial
2014 UCI Road Para-cycling World Championships
1st  Road Race
1st  Time Trial
National Track Championships
1st  Points Race
2nd Team Pursuit
1st Overall Essex Giro Stage Race
1st Cheshire Classic Road Race
1st Stage 2 Tour de Bretagne Feminine
3rd National Road Championships, Time Trial

2015
2015 UCI Track Para-cycling World Championships
1st  Individual Pursuit
2nd 500m Time Trial
2015 UCI Road Para-cycling World Championships
1st  Road Race
1st  Time Trial
National Track Championships
1st  Team Pursuit
1st Cheshire Classic Road Race
1st Overall National Time Trial Series
3rd National Road Championships, Time Trial
3rd Points Race, Revolution – Round 4, Glasgow

2016
Paralympic Games
1st  Individual Pursuit
1st  Time Trial
1st  Road Race
2016 UCI Track Para-cycling World Championships
1st  Individual Pursuit
2nd 500m Time Trial
2nd Scratch Race
3rd National Road Championships, Time Trial

2017
National Track Championships
3rd Team Pursuit

2019
2019 UCI Track Para-cycling World Championships
1st  Individual Pursuit

2020
2019 UCI Track Para-cycling World Championships
1st  Individual Pursuit
1st  Scratch Race
1st  Omnium

2020
Paralympic Games
1st  Individual Pursuit
1st  Time Trial
1st  Road Race

World records

See also
 2012 Olympics gold post boxes in the United Kingdom
 List of multiple Paralympic gold medalists
 List of multiple Paralympic gold medalists at a single Games

References

External links

 Barney and Sarah Storey personal website
 
 
 
 
 
 

1977 births
Living people
People from Disley
Sportspeople from Manchester
Sportspeople from Cheshire
English track cyclists
English female cyclists
Paralympic swimmers of Great Britain
Paralympic cyclists of Great Britain
British female backstroke swimmers
British female medley swimmers
British female breaststroke swimmers
English female freestyle swimmers
World record holders in paralympic swimming
Swimmers at the 1992 Summer Paralympics
Swimmers at the 1996 Summer Paralympics
Swimmers at the 2000 Summer Paralympics
Swimmers at the 2004 Summer Paralympics
Paralympic gold medalists for Great Britain
Paralympic silver medalists for Great Britain
Paralympic bronze medalists for Great Britain
Dames Commander of the Order of the British Empire
Sporting dames
Cyclists at the 2010 Commonwealth Games
UCI Para-cycling World Champions
English amputees
Medalists at the 1992 Summer Paralympics
Medalists at the 1996 Summer Paralympics
Medalists at the 2000 Summer Paralympics
Medalists at the 2004 Summer Paralympics
Medalists at the 2008 Summer Paralympics
Medalists at the 2012 Summer Paralympics
Medalists at the 2020 Summer Paralympics
Cyclists at the 2008 Summer Paralympics
Cyclists at the 2012 Summer Paralympics
Cyclists at the 2016 Summer Paralympics
Cyclists at the 2020 Summer Paralympics
Paralympic medalists in cycling
Paralympic medalists in swimming
Commonwealth Games competitors for England
People with chronic fatigue syndrome
S10-classified Paralympic swimmers